Gelechia sirotina is a moth of the family Gelechiidae. It is found in Belarus, Tajikistan and the Russian Far East.

References

Moths described in 1986
Gelechia